Queen Heonae of the Hwangju Hwangbo clan (964 – 20 January 1029), or formally called Grand Queen Mother Heonae, was a Goryeo royal family member as the second and oldest daughter of Wang Uk, and younger sister of King Seongjong who became a queen consort through her marriage with her half first cousin, King Gyeongjong as his third wife. After his death, she served as a regent from 997 to 1009 as regent of her son, King Mokjong. From this marriage, Queen Heonae became the third Goryeo queen who adopted her maternal clan's surname after Queen Heonui, her half first cousin. She is better known as Queen Mother Cheonchu.

Biography

Early life and background
The future Queen Heonae was born in 964 as the second and oldest daughter of Wang Uk, and his wife and half sister, Lady Ryu. She had three brothers and a younger sister who would become the biological mother of the 8th ruler, King Hyeonjong. As her parents died young, she and her siblings were raised by their paternal grandmother, Queen Sinjeong. By then, Heonae and her younger sister adopted Sinjeong's Hwangbo clan of Hwangju as their surname, which they used even after marrying their half first cousin. Beside that, not much records are left about the young queen's life.

Marriage and succession to the throne
Alongside her younger sister, Heonae entered King Gyeongjong's palace not long after his ascension and she became his third queen consort. Shortly after this, the new queen became pregnant and Gyeongjong was said to be very happy since he didn't have any heirs from the other two queens: the lack of an heir was a concern, so at the same time Heonae became pregnant, she became his favorite one. Finally, she gave birth to their oldest son (Wang Song), which made the king more delighted.

In 981, King Gyeongjong died and Heonae's second older brother Wang Chi succeeded her husband's throne over her son who was still 2 years old at that time. The Queen then left the palace and stayed outside from it. The new king, who tried to make Confucianism became the State religion, emphasized purity and chastity towards his two younger sisters. Later on, Seongjong, who had no sons, issued the order that his nephew Wang Song would be his successor and took him to the palace, raising him like his own son. Wang Song then ascended the throne in 997 after his maternal uncle's death and chose his mother to become his regent. She then stayed in Cheonchu Hall (천추전, 千秋殿), Cheonchu Palace (천추궁, 千秋宮), and that's why she is better known as Queen Mother Cheonchu (천추태후, 千秋太后).

Scandal with Gim Chi-yang
Meanwhile, after King Gyeongjong's death, Heonae met Gim Chi-yang (김치양, 金致陽), who came from the Dongju Gim clan and became a monk early on. Often meeting Gim, she came to sympathize with him, but her older brother forbade their meetings. However, she still secretly met Gim, which, when it became public, caused a riot in the palace, but Seongjong hurriedly ended the case and calmed down peoples by sending Gim into exile.

Regency
As a queen mother and regent, she summoned Gim to the palace and appointed him as a government official. Under her patronage, Gim was promoted repeatedly until he reached the position that was in charge of both financial and personnel rights, which conferred enormous power. In addition, he implemented a policy of giving preference to Seogyeong (서경, 西京; the queen mother's hometown), built conduits and temples in various places, such as the Seongsu Temple (성수사, 星宿寺) in Dongju, his birthplace.

Shortly thereafter, in 1003 (or before), they eventually had a son together and Gim then conspired to set his own son on the throne to succeed the childless King Mokjong. For this reason, the queen mother and Gim repeatedly tried to kill her own nephew, Wang Sun, as he was an obstacle to their young son's accession, but failed every time.

, his father was a son of the Goryeo's founder too, so Wang Sun was able to live under King Seongjong's extreme protection when the king was still alive. However, Sun's life became threatened when the king died due to an illness. Even after Mokjong came of age, the queen mother still acted as his regent and held the biggest power in the court, alongside Gim. Meanwhile, it was believed that the queen mother forced Wang Sun to leave the royal palace by forcing him to become a monk and tried to kill him by sending people several times after him.

When Gim burned Manwoldae, a royal palace, to the ground, threatened to kill the King and take over, King Mokjong called General Gang Jo to the capital city and Gang immediately executed Gim and his supporters. Then, the scholar officials, who were enemies of Gang, spread rumors and lies that the general was planning to take over the government for himself. These rumors reached the King and he planned to kill Gang. Hearing of the conspiracy and the doubts of the king, Gang Jo ordered his army to attack and kill all of his enemies, including the king.

Later life and death
General Gang Jo then led a coup and dethroned King Mokjong, placing Wang Sun on the throne. Heonae and Mokjong got exiled, but Mokjong was assassinated by his subordinates in Jeokseong-myeon, Paju-si on the way to Chungju, their detention site. As a result, the Queen mother was completely overthrown from the Goryeo politics in 1009 and General Gang, alongside his allies, appointed her nephew Wang Sun as the new King and ruler of Goryeo.

Soon after, she was released from exile and lived in Hwangju for 21 years, then returned to the royal palace on King Hyeonjong's 20th year of reign (1029). She then died at 66 years old in her chamber, Sungdeok Palace (숭덕궁, 崇德宮) in Gaegyeong. Meanwhile, there was a theory that she didn't get back to the palace and instead died in Myeongbok Palace in Hwangju. She was later buried in Yureung tomb (유릉, 幽陵).

In popular culture
Portrayed by Chae Shi-ra and Kim So-eun in the 2009 KBS2 TV series Empress Cheonchu.

References

External links 
 Empress Cheonchu (in Korean)
 http://www.guide2womenleaders.com/korea_heads.htm
Queen Heonae on Encykorea .
Queen Heonae on Goryeosa .
Queen Heonae on EToday News .
헌정왕후 on Doosan Encyclopedia .

10th-century rulers in Asia
10th-century Korean people
11th-century Korean people
Royal consorts of the Goryeo Dynasty
Remarried royal consorts
Korean queens consort
10th-century women rulers
964 births
1029 deaths
11th-century rulers in Asia
11th-century women rulers
Regents of Korea
Leaders ousted by a coup
10th-century Korean women
11th-century Korean women
People from North Hwanghae